San José Airport  (Aeropuerto de Puerto San José, Escuintla) serves the city of Puerto San José, the resort town of Monterrico, the port of Puerto Quetzal and the eastern Guatemalan Pacific coast. It is operated and administrated by DGAC - Dirección General de Aeronáutica Civil de Guatemala. San José Airport is in the western part of the city of Puerto San José, near the Pacific coast.

Facilities
The airport was refurbished in the early 2000s, reopening in September 2007, as part of a nationwide airport rehabilitation program.

Airlines 
 Transportes Aéreos Guatemaltecos (charter flights).
 Air Venture Tours (charter flights only)

See also
 
 
 Transport in Guatemala
 List of airports in Guatemala

References

External links 
 Dirección General de Aeronáutica Civil
 OurAirports - San José
 

Airports in Guatemala
Escuintla Department